Bobby Ljunggren (born 1961) is a Swedish songwriter. He has entered the Eurovision Song Contest as a composer six times, five times for his native Sweden (1995,  1998, 2006,  2008 and 2010), and once for Lithuania, in 2005. He is a veteran of the Melodifestivalen competition, with 50 entries, reaching the milestone of half a century of entries at Melodifestivalen 2020. In Melodifestivalen 2008, he co-wrote both the winning song and the songs placing second and third.

Eurovision Song Contest national finals entries
Melodifestivalen entries (Sweden)

Lithuanian national finals entries

Eurosong entries (Belgium)

Dansk Melodi Grand Prix entries (Denmark)

Uuden Musiikin Kilpailu entries (Finland)

References
 Bobby Ljunggren Official Website. Retrieved April 22, 2008.
 Lionheart Music - Bobby Llunggren Profile. Retrieved April 22, 2008.

Living people
1961 births
Swedish songwriters
Swedish people of Greek descent